

Batten the Hatches is the debut album by American singer-songwriter Jenny Owen Youngs. Originally self-released in 2005 by Youngs, it was reissued with the bonus track "Drinking Song" two years later by the Nettwerk label.

The track "Fuck Was I" was used in the first episode of the second season of the Showtime series Weeds, to illustrate a scene in which main character Nancy Botwin, a part-time marijuana dealer, discovers that her new lover is in fact a DEA agent. This appearance reportedly led to sales of the album increasing from between five and ten per week to between twenty and thirty per day.

The album was listed as one of Guardian Unlimited'''s "Greatest Albums You've Never Heard" in a feature in November 2006.

 Track listing All tracks written by Jenny Owen Youngs.''
 "Porchrail" – 1:45
 "From Here" – 2:16
 "Fuck Was I" – 3:30
 "Lightning Rod" – 3:27
 "Voice on Tape" – 3:03
 Featuring Regina Spektor
 "P.S." – 1:52
 "Bricks" – 5:00
 "Drinking Song" – 3:38
 "Woodcut" – 4:18
 "Coyote" – 3:14
 "Keys Out Lights On" – 5:00
 "Woodcut (The Age of Rockets remix)" – 4:04
 Remix by Andrew Futral

Personnel

Performance 
 Jenny Owen Youngs – vocals, acoustic guitar, banjo, bass
 Oscar Chabebe – tabla
 Adam Christgau – drums
 Ronen Ben Codor – harmonium
 James Cucinotta – bass clarinet
 Willie Farr Jr. – electric guitar
 Andrew Futral – synthesizer
 Hawk – viola
 Chris Hembree – piano
 Cicero Jones – French horn
 Jordan McLean – flugelhorn
 Tim Petrochko – violin
 Patrick Petty – cello
 Andrew Platt – bass instrument
 Bess Rogers – flute, voice
 Dan Romer – bass, electric guitar, keys, voice
 Jon Samson – digital kittens
 Bob Pycior – violin

Recording 
 Ronen Ben Codor – additional arrangements on track 11
 Andrew Futral – remix (track 12, reissued version), additional arrangements on tracks 3 & 5
 Jay Newland – mastering
 Dan Romer – production, engineering, arrangements, mixing

Release history

References 

2005 debut albums
Jenny Owen Youngs albums
Nettwerk Records albums
Self-released albums